Sonja Louise Barth (21 May 1923 – 10 September 2016) was a Norwegian environmentalist.

During World War II she was active in XU, the secret Norwegian resistance operation whose activities were kept secret until 1988. In 2008 she described her experiences to Lars Otto Wollum, on condition that he publish nothing of them until after her death.

In 2008 she was appointed to the Royal Norwegian Order of Saint Olav. The citation referred to her work in public education and the dissemination of natural and cultural history, and to her work in the Rondane region.

On 14 November 1945 she married Edvard Kaurin Barth (1913–1996), a photographer and zoologist.

References

External links
 Includes photograph of Barth

1923 births
2016 deaths
20th-century Norwegian women scientists
Environmental scientists
XU